I Like It That Way is a 1934 American pre-Code musical film directed by Harry Lachman and starring Gloria Stuart, Roger Pryor and Marian Marsh.

The film depicts the story of a telephone operator who quits her job to become a singer at a nightclub.

Main cast
 Gloria Stuart as Anne Rogers  
 Roger Pryor as Jack Anderson  
 Marian Marsh as Joan Anderson 
 Shirley Grey as Peggy  
 Onslow Stevens as Harry Rogers  
 Lucile Gleason as Mrs. Anderson  
 Noel Madison as Jimmy Stuart  
 Gloria Shea as Trixie  
 Mae Busch as Elsie 
 Merna Kennedy as Telephone Company Information Girl 
 Mickey Rooney as Messenger Boy  
 Clarence Wilson as The Professor 
 Eddie Gribbon as Joe 
 Virginia Sale as Old Maid
 Adrian Morris as Lothario in Chinese Restaurant

References

Bibliography
 Clifford McCarty. Film Composers in America: A Filmography, 1911-1970. Oxford University Press, 2000.

External links

1934 films
American musical films
1934 musical films
Films directed by Harry Lachman
Universal Pictures films
American black-and-white films
1930s English-language films
1930s American films
English-language musical films